Heterocentron is a genus of flowering plants belonging to the family Melastomataceae.

Its native range is Mexico to Colombia.

Species:

Heterocentron alatum 
Heterocentron chimalapanum 
Heterocentron elegans 
Heterocentron evansii 
Heterocentron glandulosum 
Heterocentron hirtellum 
Heterocentron laxiflorum 
Heterocentron mexicanum 
Heterocentron muricatum 
Heterocentron purpureum 
Heterocentron subtriplinervium 
Heterocentron suffruticosum

References

Melastomataceae
Melastomataceae genera